Arthur Lavis (1924–1999) was a British cinematographer of film and television.

Selected filmography
 Private Potter (1962)
 The Barber of Stamford Hill (1962)
 A Matter of Choice (1963)
 Night Train to Paris (1964)
 The Horror of It All (1964)
 Do You Know This Voice? (1964)
 The Earth Dies Screaming (1964)
 Ring of Spies (1964)
 Joey Boy (1965)
 Catacombs (1965)
 The Penthouse (1967)
 Ten Little Indians (1989)

References

Bibliography 
 Fellner, Chris. The Encyclopedia of Hammer Films. Rowman & Littlefield, 2019.

External links 
 

1924 births
1999 deaths
British cinematographers
Mass media people from Devon